Yegor Dmitriyevich Golenkov (born 7 July 1999) is a Russian football player. He plays for FC Rostov.

Club career
He made his debut in the Russian Premier League for FC Krylia Sovetov Samara on 31 October 2016 in a game against FC Orenburg.

On 31 August 2021, he signed a two-year contract with Czech club SK Sigma Olomouc.

On 9 February 2022, Golenkov signed a five-year contract with FC Rostov.

Career statistics

References

External links
 

1999 births
Living people
Russian footballers
Association football forwards
PFC Krylia Sovetov Samara players
SK Sigma Olomouc players
FC Rostov players
Russian Premier League players
Russian First League players
Russian Second League players
Russian expatriate footballers
Expatriate footballers in the Czech Republic
Russian expatriate sportspeople in the Czech Republic